Exchange programs for Electrical Engineering students between 18 universities in Europe. It is also known as Entree. Their members are:
 Chalmers Lindholmen University College (Sweden)
 University of Aalborg (Denmark) 
 Heriot-Watt University (United Kingdom) 
 Brunel University (United Kingdom) 
 Delft University of Technology (Netherlands) 
 Université libre de Bruxelles (Belgium) 
 Technische Universität Dresden (Germany) 
 Karlsruhe Institute of Technology (Germany) 
 École Supérieure d'Ingénieurs en Électronique et Électrotechnique Paris (France) 
 École Supérieure d'Ingénieurs en Électronique et Électrotechnique Amiens (France) 
 École polytechnique fédérale de Lausanne (Switzerland) 
 Brno University of Technology (Czech Republic) 
 National Technical University of Athens (Greece) 
 Politecnico di Milano (Italy) 
 Pontifical Comillas University of Madrid (Spain) 
 University of Valladolid (Spain) 
 Institut Méditerranéen de Technologie (France) 
 Politecnico di Torino (Italy)

References 

College and university associations and consortia in Europe
Electrical engineering organizations
Engineering university associations and consortia